Tara Air Pvt. Ltd. is an airline headquartered in Kathmandu, Nepal. It is a subsidiary of Yeti Airlines. Tara Air was formed in 2009 using aircraft from the Yeti Airlines fleet and is based at Tribhuvan International Airport, with a secondary hub at Nepalgunj Airport. The airline operates scheduled flights and air charter services with a fleet of STOL aircraft, previously provided by Yeti Airlines. Its operations focus on serving remote and mountainous airports and airstrips.

History 
Tara Air was formed in 2009 when Yeti Airlines split its STOL aircraft operations from its regional operations. The airline's STOL operations were rebranded as Tara Air and focused on providing services into remote and mountainous airports and airstrips.

Destinations 

The airline operates scheduled domestic flights to a number of destinations as well as offering air charter services. Tara Air operates daily scheduled flights between Kathmandu and Lukla, and between Jomsom and Pokhara. Other destinations are served at varying frequency.

Codeshare agreements
Tara Air has a codeshare agreement with its mother company Yeti Airlines.

Fleet
Tara Air's fleet consists of the following aircraft (as of June 2022):

Accidents and incidents 
Tara Air has been considered one of the "most unsafe airlines" due to several significant incidents.

On 26 May 2010, a DHC-6 Twin Otter took off from Birendranagar Airport in Surkhet heading for Talcha Airport in Rara with 18 passengers and 3 crew on board. At 10 am the aircraft had to make an emergency landing at Birendranagar Airport after its cabin door suddenly opened five minutes after take-off. Tara Air officials said that the cabin attendant managed to lock the door immediately after it opened to avert any possible mishaps.

 On 15 December 2010, a DHC-6 Twin Otter crashed shortly after takeoff from Lamidanda Airport in Nepal; it was en route to Kathmandu. All 19 passengers and 3 flight crew were killed.

On 23 June 2011, a Tara Air Dornier 228 was substantially damaged in a heavy landing and runway excursion at Simikot Airport, Nepal. The aircraft was operating a cargo flight from Nepalgunj Airport.

 On 21 September 2012, a DHC-6 Twin Otter en route from Dolpa to Nepalgunj was damaged during takeoff when the pilot lost directional control. No one was hurt in the incident.

On 24 February 2016, Tara Air Flight 193 went missing shortly after take off whilst traveling to Pokhara-Jomsom. It was later found that the aircraft crashed into the mountainous northern region killing 23 people including 2 babies and 3 crew members.

 On 22 April 2019, a Tara Air Dornier 228 aircraft skidded off the runway upon landing at Ramechhap Airport. Due to adverse weather, the flight from Tribhuvan International Airport to Lukla Airport was diverted to Ramechhap Airport. All of the crew and passengers evacuated the aircraft safely.

 On 1 December 2021, a Tara Air DHC-6 Twin Otter aircraft had a tyre burst upon landing at Bajura Airport. While no one was injured, a video of passengers pushing the aircraft off the runway, as there was no suitable vehicle at the airport, went viral.

 On 29 May 2022, Tara Air Flight 197 lost contact with ATC 12 minutes after takeoff from Pokhara Airport. The wreckage was found 20 hours later on the side of a mountain in Sanosware, Mustang District; none of the 22 on board survived.

Notes

References

External links 

 

Airlines banned in the European Union
Airlines of Nepal
Airlines established in 2009
2009 establishments in Asia
2009 establishments in Nepal